New Zealand competed at the 1994 Winter Olympics in Lillehammer, Norway.

Alpine skiing

Men

Men's combined

Women

Short track speed skating

Men

References
Official Olympic Reports
 Olympic Winter Games 1994, full results by sports-reference.com

Nations at the 1994 Winter Olympics
1994
Winter Olympics